The 5150 Tour was a concert tour by American hard rock band Van Halen in support of their seventh studio album, 5150.

Background
This was the band's first tour with Sammy Hagar on lead vocals (and second electric guitar), following the acrimonious departure of original singer David Lee Roth.

Like many Van Halen tours, the routing took the band across North America only, as traveling internationally was hard for the band's complicated and heavy stage set. Furthermore, Hagar wanted to establish himself as the new singer in their homeland. The first leg of the tour was entirely United States dates, though Canadian ones slipped into the second and third legs.

The tour took place in the aftermath of the David Lee Roth-Van Halen split, with the fanbase being split too. Those who had joined the new Van Halen's side used the concerts as an opportunity to voice their stance, frequently via unison chants of "Fuck Dave!" The tour set a trend later Hagar-era ones would follow: the number of pre-Hagar Van Halen songs was kept to a minimum, with the singer willing only to play that era's best-known songs. An Eddie Van Halen/Hagar guitar duel was also a usual part of the concerts. "Rock and Roll" by Led Zeppelin was the closing song every night. Canadian rock legends Bachman–Turner Overdrive, Loverboy and Kim Mitchell opened a few dates in Rochester and Buffalo, and were support acts on many of the outdoor stadium gigs in North America.

The tour was supposed to start with dates in Hawaii and Alaska, but they were cancelled at the last minute, due to the band finishing the mixing of the album.

The group's biggest hit, "Jump", was usually omitted from the set list, or sung by the audience instead of Hagar. Almost all the songs from 5150 were played, as well as covers and some of Hagar's pre-Van Halen work. The latter included his recent MTV hit "I Can't Drive 55" and Montrose songs. The addition of Hagar's guitar gave Eddie Van Halen more room to move, or to play keyboards on certain songs.

The tour was a major high for the band, albeit with a couple of low points. The first was when their new manager Ed Leffler was hospitalized in Texas after an altercation in a hotel elevator. The second was when Eddie's wife Valerie Bertinelli suffered a miscarriage; she didn't reveal to Eddie that she was pregnant at the time, until it was too late.

"We were selling records faster than they could print them and we were selling out every show," recalled Hagar. "We felt invincible."

The second concert at New Haven Coliseum was filmed and shown live on television and released on VHS as Live Without a Net; it has subsequently been released on DVD.

Before the last show of the tour on November 3, 1986 at the Cow Palace, Eddie cut his hair into a braided rat tail, while Alex shaved his head bald. The story was that supposedly at the end of the tour, everyone would have their heads shaved (Sammy chose not to for maintaining his look for a photo shoot soon to come, Michael chose not to in fear of not knowing how long it would take to grow back as his hair was thinning at the time.

Reception
Moira McCormick from Billboard who attended the Chicago performance at Rosemont Horizon, gave the performance a positive review. She opened her review stating that the band's concert that night was further testimony to the band's previous success with both David Lee Roth and the popularity of the guitarist Eddie Van Halen whom she claimed can triumph in speed contests and praised him for performing with "incredible finesse". Regarding the vocalist Sammy Hagar, she said that the audience had welcomed him as the band's lead singer, being supportive of his vocal work especially on the band's older material. She concluded her review, stating that the band was still one of America's leading rock forces, judging by the record sales and audience reactions.

Setlist
"You Really Got Me"
"There's Only One Way to Rock"
"Summer Nights"
"Get Up"
"Drum solo"
"Dreams"
"5150"
"Bass Solo"
"Panama"
"Best of Both Worlds"
"Love Walks In"
"Good Enough"
"Guitar Solo"
"I Can't Drive 55"
Ain't Talkin' 'bout Love"
Encore
"Why Can't This Be Love"
"Jump"
"Rock and Roll" (Led Zeppelin cover)

Tour dates

Box office score data

Personnel
 Eddie Van Halen – guitar, backing vocals, lead keyboards
 Michael Anthony – bass, backing vocals, keyboards
 Alex Van Halen – drums
 Sammy Hagar – lead vocals, guitar

References

External links
 Van-Halen.com – The official Van Halen website
 Van Halen NewsDesk

Van Halen concert tours
1986 concert tours